In the Dark With You is an album by folk singer/guitarist Greg Brown, released in 1985.

Reception

Writing for Allmusic, music critic William Ruhlman called the album "Humorous and sardonic reflections on domestic life and aging, from a journeyman folksinger."

Track listing
All song by Greg Brown.
 "Who Woulda Thunk It" – 4:33
 "In the Dark with You" – 3:41
 "Help Me Make It Through This Funky Day" – 4:07
 "I Slept All Night by My Lover" – 3:19
 "Where Do the Wild Geese Go" – 3:06
 "Good Morning Coffee" – 2:58
 "All the Money's Gone" – 4:58
 "Letters from Europe" – 4:31
 "Just a Bum" – 4:12
 "Who Do You Think You're Fooling" – 5:53
 "People With Bad Luck" – 4:06
 "In the Water" – 4:23

Personnel
Greg Brown – vocals, guitar
John Angus Foster – bass
Randy Sabien – mandolin, violin
Felix James – conga
Prudence Johnson – background vocals
Dave Moore – harmonica, button accordion, pan pipes

Production
Produced by Greg Brown and Bob Feldman
Engineered and mixed by Tom Mudge and Tom Tucker

References

Greg Brown (folk musician) albums
1985 albums
Red House Records albums